Ethiopia competed at the 1996 Summer Olympics in Atlanta, United States.

Medalists

Gold
 Haile Gebrselassie — Athletics, Men's 10000 metres
 Fatuma Roba — Athletics, Women's marathon

Bronze
 Gete Wami — Athletics, Women's 10000 metres

Results by event

Athletics

Men 

Track and road events

Women 

Track and road events

Boxing

References
Official Olympic Reports
International Olympic Committee results database

Oly
Nations at the 1996 Summer Olympics
1996 Summer Olympics